Sandelia is a genus of climbing gouramies native to freshwater habitats in South Africa.

Species
There are currently two recognized species in this genus:
 Sandelia bainsii Castelnau, 1861 (Rocky kurper)
 Sandelia capensis (G. Cuvier, 1829) (Cape kurper)

References 

 
Anabantidae
Freshwater fish genera

 
Taxa named by François-Louis Laporte, comte de Castelnau
Taxonomy articles created by Polbot